Aridi is a surname mainly based in Mount Lebanon. Notable people with the surname include:

Ghazi Aridi (born 1954), Lebanese politician, MP, and government minister 
Saleh al Aridi (1957–2008), Lebanese politician

See also
Physa aridi, a fossil species